The British Aerobatic Association (BAeA) handles all domestic aerobatic competitions in the United Kingdom.

History
It was formed on 1 May 1974. Its members teach and fly aerobatics at many airfields around the United Kingdom, for example the West London Aero Club at White Waltham Airfield.

Activities
The BAeA holds 12-14 aerobatic events around the UK and Ireland each year. As at 2018 the BAeA's Chairman is Steven Todd and the Vice Chairman is Philip Massetti.

External links
 Official website of the British Aerobatic Association
 Training directory

Sports organizations established in 1974
Aviation organisations based in the United Kingdom
Aerobatic organizations
1974 establishments in the United Kingdom
Sports clubs in Berkshire